Jody Weiner (b. Jody Carl Weiner) is an American novelist, non-fiction author, film producer and lawyer.

Weiner wrote the literary suspense novel Prisoners of Truth (2004). The novel draws in part from his experiences defending high-profile criminal cases in Chicago. Along with Jane Goodall, Mark Bekoff, Dave Soldier and other animal activists, he co-authored Kinship With Animals (2006), an anthology of true interspecies encounters. In the book, he writes about serving as attorney to Koko the Gorilla. Weiner also co-edited Resistance: A Radical Political and Social History of the Lower East Side by Clayton Patterson (2007), and co-managed publication of  Vali Myers-a Memoir by Gianni Menichetti (2007). Weiner was also advisor and legal counsel for the documentary A Conversation with Koko (1999), which received a Genesis Award for Best PBS Documentary in 2000. Weiner was also a consulting producer and wrote additional dialogue for Hoodwinked Too! Hood vs. Evil (animated feature film, The Weinstein Company 2011). Weiner also co-authored Peoplescapes, My Story From Purging To Painting an illustrated Memoir by Nancy Calef with Jody Weiner (2014 Babu Books).   He was also advisor to the feature film Loveless in Los Angeles (2006) and writer/director of the animated music video Lost My Mind Again (2004), and producer of Perfect Two, a music video by Ceej  (Hoodwinked Too! Hood vs. Evil  soundtrack, 2011).

Weiner was born and raised in Chicago, where he spent eleven years defending criminal cases in state and federal courts. In 1985, he moved to San Francisco. There he began to write books and practice civil law securing million-dollar verdicts. Weiner's clients have ranged from MRI machine inventor Raymond Damadian to an Ohio death row inmate, from  NBA All-Star Norm Van Lier to SKYY vodka inventor Maurice Kanbar. He has also advised the Artist's Guild of San Francisco and the Gorilla Foundation, and he is a former Director of the Golda Foundation. Weiner is a director of the Litquake Foundation, producer of the annual San Francisco Litquake Festival. Weiner was a 2013 recipient of The Acker Award for achievement in the Avant Garde. He holds a B.A. in sociology from the University of Wisconsin, Madison and a J.D. from DePaul University.
Weiner is a member of the California and the Illinois State Bar, Federal District Courts for the Northern Districts of California and Illinois, and the Court of Appeals for the Sixth, Seventh and Ninth Federal Circuits. Weiner is married to contemporary American figurative painter Nancy Calef.

Works published
 Prisoners of Truth (2004, softcover 2006, Council Oak Books) and 
 Kinship With Animals (2006, Council Oak Books) (co-author, introduction by William Shatner)
 Resistance: A Radical Political and Social History of the Lower East Side by Clayton Patterson. (2007, Seven Stories Press) (co-editor)
 “Hot Koko,”  California Lawyer,  July 2005. p. 80.
Peoplescapes, My Story From Purging To Painting an illustrated Memoir by Nancy Calef with Jody Weiner (2014 Babu Books).

References

External links
"Making the Divisadero World Better" by Leah Garchik in the San Francisco Chronicle, June 22, 2011

Litquake Lit Cast Episode 9: "The Dirty Side of Democracy" podcast at San Francisco's Tosca Cafe, October 7, 2012, hosted by author Jody Weiner, Litquake web site

"Peoplescapes with Artist Nancy Calef and Jody Weiner" The Beat Museum web site

"STYLE Counsel: Advice on How to Dress from writer and attorney Jody Weiner" by Sylvia Rubin in the San Francisco Chronicle, December 4, 1997

"Nancy Calef Writes of Recovering from a Mom’s Madness" by Edward Guthmann in the San Francisco Chronicle, May 20, 2014

"These Mean Streets: Reality and Fiction collide" event at San Francisco's Tosca Café on October 16, 2011, hosted by author-lawyer Jody Weiner mentioned in "Black Panther and Red Carpet are a Go" by Leah Garchik in the San Francisco Chronicle, October 14, 2011

"Writing and Fighting: Creative Couples Collaborating" Litquake event moderated by Jody Weiner and Nancy Calef mentioned in "Kansas City's contribution to this City by the Bay" by Leah Garchik in the San Francisco Chronicle, October 23, 2014
 Jody Weiner, author of Prisoners of Truth and attorney, is summoned and excused from jury duty:
Leah Garchik column in the San Francisco Chronicle, October 7, 2004
 Book website
 Author website

Living people
University of Wisconsin–Madison College of Letters and Science alumni
DePaul University College of Law alumni
American film producers
American male writers
Year of birth missing (living people)